Kibar is a Turkish name. Notable people with this name include:

 Kibar Khalvashi (born 1963), Georgian businessman
 Kibar Tatar (born 1968), Turkish boxer
 Melih Kibar (1951–2005), Turkish composer
 Osman Kibar (born 1974), Turkish-American billionaire